Army Group F was a strategic command formation of the Wehrmacht during the Second World War. The commander of Army Group F served also as the Oberbefehlshaber Südost (OB South East).

Created 12 August 1943, at Bayreuth (WK XIII), it was primarily stationed in the Balkans. Its commander from August 1943 was Maximilian von Weichs promoted to Generalfeldmarschall on 1 February 1943, with Lieutenant General Hermann Foertsch serving as the Chief of Staff. Its primary participation in combat was in defending against possible Allied invasion in what was seen as Germany's "weak underbelly", and fighting off local partisan groups that were gaining strength. In late 1944, it oversaw the German retreat from Greece and most of Yugoslavia in the wake of the Budapest Offensive.

The Army Group included for much of the war the 2nd Panzer Army in Yugoslavia and Albania, and the Army Group E in Greece.

Order of Battle November 1943
2nd Panzer Army
Army Staff units
III SS Panzer Corps, SS-Obergruppenführer Felix Steiner
XV Mountain Corps, General of Infantry  Ernst von Leyser
XXI Mountain Corps, General of Panzer troops Gustav Fehn
LXIX Corps, z.b.V. General of Infantry Helge Auleb
V SS Mountain Corps, General Lieutenant Artur Phleps
Army Group E
Army Group Staff units
XXII Mountain Corps, General of Mountain troops Hubert Lanz
LXVIII Army Corps, General of Aviation Hellmuth Felmy
Troops of the commander of the fortress Crete
Bulgarian II (Aegean) Corps
Troops of the Militärbefehlshaber Südost General of Infantry Hans Felber

Order of Battle July 1944
The subordinate units of the Army Group were predominantly the less capable "fortress" and reserve divisions, collaborationist foreign volunteer units such as the "Cossacks" and 392nd (Croatian) Infantry Division.
2nd Panzer Army
Army Staff units
XV Mountain Corps, General of Infantry  Ernst von Leyser
XXI Mountain Corps, General of Panzer troops Gustav Fehn
LXIX Corps z.b.V., General of Infantry Helge Auleb
V SS Mountain Corps, General Lieutenant Arthur Phleps
Army Group E
Army Group Staff units
XXII Mountain Corps, General of Mountain troops Hubert Lanz
LXVIII Army Corps, General of Aviation Hellmuth Felmy
Troops of the commander of the fortress Crete
Bulgarian II (Aegean) Corps
Troops of the Militärbefehlshaber Südost, General of Infantry Hans Felber

For the defence of Serbia, the Commander of Army Group F assembled Army Group Serbia on 26 September 1944. Army Detachment Serbia commanded by General Hans Felber. Army Group Serbia was disbanded on 27 October 1944.

Army Group F was disbanded 25 March 1945.

Commanders

See also 
World War II in Yugoslavia

References

Sources
 Hogg, Ian V., German Order of Battle 1944: The regiments, formations and units of the German ground forces, Arms and Armour Press, London, 1975
 Thomas, Nigel, (Author), Andrew, Stephen, (Illustrator), The German Army 1939-45 (4): Eastern Front 1943-45 (Men-at-Arms 330), Osprey Publishing, 1998 
 Mitcham, Samuel W., Jr., German Defeat in the East, 1944-45 (Stackpole Military History), 2007 

 Heeresgruppe F - Lexikon des Wehrmacht 
 National archive Washington documents:
 T311, Roll 187 -  Heeresgruppe F 1943/1944.
 T311, Roll 188 -  Heeresgruppe F 1944.
 T311, Roll 189 -  Heeresgruppe F 1944/1945.
 T311, Roll 190 -  Heeresgruppe F 1944/1945.
 T311, Roll 194 -  Heeresgruppe F 1944.
 T311, Roll 195 -  Heeresgruppe F 1944.
 T311, Roll 196 -  Heeresgruppe F 1944/1945.
 T311, Roll 285 -  Heeresgruppe F 1943/1944.
 T311, Roll 286 -  Heeresgruppe F 1944.

F
Modern history of the Balkans
Military units and formations established in 1943
Military units and formations disestablished in 1945